Nizam Uddin Hazari is an Awami League politician and member of parliament from Feni-2.

Early life 
Uddin was born on 1 January 1966. He has a B.com degree. His mother was Dil Afroze Begum and his father was Zainal Abedin.

Career 
Uddin started politics while he was a student of Chittagong Govt. Commerce College. In the 1990s Uddin worked under AJM Nasir Uddin in Chittagong. Uddin was sentenced to jail on an arms case on 22 March 1992. He returned to Feni in 1997 to work under Joynal Hazari.

On 16 August 2000, a court in Chittagong sentenced Uddin to ten years imprisonment on an arms case. He was released after serving five years in jail. He had appealed against the verdict with Bangladesh High Court and Bangladesh Supreme Court.

Uddin was mayor of Feni in 2011.

Uddin was elected to parliament from Feni-2 in 2014 unopposed as the election was boycotted by all major political parties. He resigned from the post of Mayor of Feni to participate in the election.

In May 2014, Ekramul Haque, Chairperson of Fulgazi Upazila, was assassinated. All of the accused were followers of Uddin. Uddin and Joynal Hazari blamed each other over the murder. According to The Daily Star, Uddin is believed to be behind the murder but he was not charged in case.

On 8 June 2014, Bangladesh High Court issued a ruling asking the Election Commission, Government of Bangladesh, and Uddin to explain why his parliamentary membership should not be cancelled due to his conviction in the arms case. Two subsequent benches of Bangladesh High Court said they were "too embarrassed" to hear the case and it was delayed.

Hearing in the case over Uddin's parliamentary seat began on 19 June 2016 under justices Md Emdadul Huq and Md Iqbal Kabir who deferred the verdict. On 2 March 2018, Justice Md Abu Zafor Siddique gave a verdict in favor of Uddin that allowed him to keep his parliamentary seat.

In January 2017, Uddin sued the editor, Iqbal Sobhan Chowdhury, of the Daily Observer over a report in the newspaper that described him as a drug lord. In November 2017, Bangladesh Nationalist Party alleged Uddin of being responsible for an attack on the convoy of Khaleda Zia, former Prime Minister and Chairperson of Bangladesh Nationalist Party.

Uddin was re-elected in 2018 from Feni-2 as a candidate of Awami League. He is Trustee Board member of Feni University.

Uddin visited Feni jail without permission and violating rules numerous times in 2019 to visit imprisoned Jubo League leaders.

References

Living people
People from Feni District
Awami League politicians
11th Jatiya Sangsad members
Place of birth missing (living people)
1966 births